Comatose may refer to:

 Being in a state of a coma, or being unconscious
 Comatose (album), a 2006 album by Skillet
 "Comatose" (Skillet song), the title song
 "Comatose", a song by Ayreon from 01011001, 2008
 "Comatose", a song by Bad Wolves from Dear Monsters, 2021
 "Comatose", a song by Coheed and Cambria from the album Vaxis – Act II: A Window of the Waking Mind, 2022
 "Comatose", a song by Chimaira from Chimaira, 2005
 "Comatose", a song by Depeche Mode from Exciter, 2001
 "Comatose", a song by Front Line Assembly from (FLA)vour of the Weak, 1997
 "Comatose", a song by jxdn, 2020
 "Comatose", a song by Mikky Ekko from Time, 2015
 "Comatose", a song by Nina Sky from Nicole and Natalie, 2012
 "Comatose", a song by Northlane from Discoveries, 2011
 "Comatose", a song by P.M. Dawn from Of the Heart, of the Soul and of the Cross: The Utopian Experience, 1991
 "Comatose", a song by Pearl Jam from Pearl Jam, 2006
 "Comatose", a song by Threat Signal from Threat Signal, 2011